Murat Yıldırım (born 13 April 1979) is a Turkish actor.

Early life 
Murat Yıldırım was born in Konya, Turkey. His father is of Kurdish origin and was a teacher of literature. Yıldırım's father speaks Turkish and Kurdish. His mother is of Arab descent and speaks Arabic as well, but Murat Yıldırım is neither fluent in Kurdish nor Arabic. Due to his father's job Yıldırım grew up between Konya and Adana. He has two sisters.

He graduated in Mechanical Engineering from the Yıldız Technical University in Istanbul, Turkey and he has a keen interest in mathematics.  His interest in music and theatre started early on in his life as well. As a student, Yıldırım played drums in a band.  During his studying period he also started performing with his University's theatrical team and attending acting lessons.

Career 
After performing three years in theater, a writer who watched him perform in a comedy recommended him to attend a casting in Beşiktaş Cultural Center.

Television
Thus he played his first minor role in Ölümsüz Aşk which was written by Yılmaz Erdoğan. Later he performed in Bütün Çocuklarım and in Büyük Yalan. His first leading role was in the series Fırtına where he met his future first wife, Burçin Terzioğlu.

In 2007 he starred in Asi which was nominated for the International TV Audience Award-Best Drama TV Series at the 51st Monte-Carlo Television Festival alongside Tuba Büyüküstün.After the end of Asi Yıldırım agreed to act in Aşk ve Ceza alongside Nurgül Yeşilçay. 

His next role, in 2012, was Ecevit in the hit series Suskunlar which the first Turkish drama sold to the USA market for remake alongside Aslı Enver.
In middle 2015 Yıldırım signed a contract with O3 productions and MBC Group for an upcoming series, which eventually premiered in early 2016 under the title Gecenin Kraliçesi. In 2017, together with his wife Iman Elbani, he played in a music video for American singer Jessica Sutta's single, "When a Girl Loves a Boy". From 2019 to 2021, he starred as the titular character in the crime-mafia action series Ramo, alongside co-star Esra Bilgiç. From 2021 to 2022, he shared the leading roles with Damla Sönmez in the period drama Aziz on Show TV. He currently stars as one of the lead roles in the TRT1 series Teşkilat about Mit.

Film
He also had a brief appearance in the Turkish film Organize İşler.  He got nominated for Golden Orange Award for Best Actor for his leading role in the film  Araf. During the filming of Asi he starred opposite Beren Saat in the movie Güz sancisi about Istanbul pogrom. In late 2014, Yıldırım returned on screens, after a break of one a half years, portraying Lieutenant Sadık Turan in the movie Kırımlı based on the autobiographical novel Korkunç Yıllar. In 2015, he appeared as Sinan in the film adaptation of Turkey's 2014 best-selling novel Kocan Kadar Konuş. The romantic comedy was released on 20 March 2015, to positive reviews. Due to its commercial success, a sequel was announced shortly after the film's release. The sequel, named Kocan Kadar Konuş-Diriliş was released on 1 January 2016.

Personal life 
Yıldırım met his first wife, Burçin Terzioğlu, while filming the TV series Fırtına. They were married from 2008 to 2014. On 10 March 2016, he married former beauty pageant title holder of Morocco and actress Iman Elbani. Elbani, who was pregnant with the couple's child, suffered a miscarriage in 2019. The couple suffered another miscarriage in 2020. Elbani has suffered a total of five miscarriages. The couple welcomed their first child, a daughter, in October 2022.

Filmography

References

External links
 

Living people
Turkish male film actors
Turkish people of Arab descent
Turkish people of Kurdish descent
Turkish male television actors
People from Konya
Yıldız Technical University alumni
Year of birth missing (living people)